Mark L. Born (born April 14, 1976) is an American law enforcement officer and politician.

Born in Beaver Dam, Wisconsin, Born graduated from Gustavus Adolphus College. He then worked in the Dodge County, Wisconsin sheriff department. Born also served on the Beaver Dam Common Council. In November 2012, Born was elected to the Wisconsin State Assembly as a Republican.

On Wednesday, June 22, 2022, Governor Evers’ called for a Special Session to defend reproductive rights in Wisconsin to introduce and pass AB 713 and AB 106, which would have protected the right for women to have a say over their bodies. Despite the fact that there is a bipartisan support for legal access to abortion from both Wisconsin Democrats and Republicans, Mark Born and other Republicans in the Legislature gaveled in and gaveled out at the special session without protecting women's rights and leaving 1.3 million Wisconsin women of reproductive age without rights to their own bodies.

References

Living people
Politicians from Beaver Dam, Wisconsin
Gustavus Adolphus College alumni
Wisconsin city council members
Republican Party members of the Wisconsin State Assembly
1976 births
21st-century American politicians